Oleksandr Vasylyovych Starukh (born 28 April 1973) is a Ukrainian historian and politician. On 18 December 2020 he was appointed as Governor of Zaporizhzhia Oblast. He had previously been Governor of Zaporizhzhia Oblast from 2008 to 2010. On 24 January 2023, he was removed from his position as Governor.

Biography 
Starukh studied history at Zaporizhzhia National University (1995). Candidate of Historical Sciences (1998), Associate Professor (2003).

In the 1998 Ukrainian parliamentary election Starukh failed to get elected to the Ukrainian parliament for People's Movement of Ukraine.

In 2007 and 2008 Starukh worked in the Secretariat of the President of Ukraine regional development department.

On 25 September 2008, President Viktor Yushchenko appointed Starukh Governor of Zaporizhzhia Oblast. He was dismissed from this post by Yanukovych on 18 March 2010.

(Kaltsev gained 38.40% of the votes, Starukh finished second with 15.73%.) 

In the 2014 Ukrainian parliamentary election Starukh was placed 49th on the (national) election list of Batkivshchyna, but he was not elected because the party won 17 seats on the (national) party list, and two seats in majority constituencies.

In the 2015 Ukrainian local elections Starukh was elected a member of the Zaporizhzhia Oblast Council for Batkivshchyna.

On 18 December 2020 Starukh was (again) appointed as Governor of Zaporizhzhia Oblast by President Volodymyr Zelenskyy.

On 24 January 2023, he was removed from his position as Governor.

Starukh is a member of the All-Ukrainian Union "Fatherland".

References

External links 
 

1973 births
Living people
Politicians from Zaporizhzhia
21st-century Ukrainian historians
Governors of Zaporizhzhia Oblast
All-Ukrainian Union "Fatherland" politicians
21st-century Ukrainian politicians
Recipients of the Order of Merit (Ukraine), 3rd class